Gyaritodes inspinosus is a species of beetle in the family Cerambycidae, and the type species of its genus. It was described by Stephan von Breuning in 1947.

References

Gyaritini
Beetles described in 1947
Taxa named by Stephan von Breuning (entomologist)